Ampthill is the name of several things around the world.

Places

United Kingdom
 Ampthill, a town in Bedfordshire, England
 Ampthill Park, an estate in Ampthill, Bedfordshire, England
 Ampthill RUFC, a rugby club in Ampthill, England
 Ampthill Town F.C., a football club in Ampthill, England
 Ampthill Clay, a geologic formation in England
 Ampthill Tunnel, a railway tunnel near Ampthill, England
 Ampthill Rural District, a rural district in Bedfordshire, England that existed from 1894 to 1974
 Ampthill railway station, a railway station near Ampthill, England

United States
 Ampthill (Chesterfield County, Virginia), an 18th-century plantation in Chesterfield County, Virginia
 Ampthill (Cumberland County, Virginia), an 1830s plantation in Cumberland County, Virginia

People
 Baron Ampthill, a title of peerage in the United Kingdom